Ray Chase may refer to:

 Ray P. Chase (1880–1948), U.S. Representative from Minnesota
 Ray Chase (voice actor) (born 1987), American actor